Seppo Sairanen (born 23 March 1952) is a Finnish football manager and a former football goalkeeper.

He played eight seasons and 150 matches in the Finnish premier division Mestaruussarja for Ässät, Pyrkivä, Ilves and PPT. Sairanen was later the head coach of Veikkausliiga club FC Jazz for three seasons. He capped six times for the Finland national team.

Honors 
Finnish Championship: 1983

References 

1952 births
Sportspeople from Pori
Finnish football managers
Finnish footballers
Finland international footballers
FC Ilves players
FC Jazz players
FC Jazz managers
Living people
Association football goalkeepers
Musan Salama players
Musan Salama managers
Ässät football players